The Bulletin of the Atomic Scientists is a nonprofit organization concerning science and global security issues resulting from accelerating technological advances that have negative consequences for humanity. The Bulletin publishes content at both a free-access website and a bi-monthly, nontechnical academic journal. The organization has been publishing continuously since 1945, when it was founded by former Manhattan Project scientists as the Bulletin of the Atomic Scientists of Chicago immediately following the atomic bombings of Hiroshima and Nagasaki. The organization is also the keeper of the symbolic Doomsday Clock, the time of which is announced each January.

Background 
One of the driving forces behind the creation of the Bulletin was the amount of public interest surrounding atomic energy and rapid technological change at the dawn of the Atomic Age. In 1945 the public interest in atomic warfare and weaponry inspired contributors to the Bulletin to attempt to inform those interested about the dangers of the nuclear arms race they knew was coming and about the destruction that atomic war could bring about. To convey the particular peril posed by nuclear weapons, the Bulletin devised the Doomsday Clock in 1947, with an original setting of seven minutes to midnight.

The minute hand of the Clock first moved closer to midnight in response to changing world events in 1949, following the first Soviet nuclear test. The Doomsday Clock is used to represent threats to humanity from a variety of sources: nuclear and other weapons of mass destruction, climate change, and disruptive technologies. 
In 2015, the Bulletin unveiled its Doomsday Dashboard, an interactive infographic that illustrates some of the data the Bulletin Science and Security Board takes into account when deciding the time of the Clock each year. As of August 2018, the Bulletin Board of Sponsors boasts 14 Nobel Laureates.

In the 1950s, the Bulletin was involved in the formation of the Pugwash Conferences on Science and World Affairs, annual conferences of scientists concerned about nuclear proliferation, and, more broadly, the role of science in modern society.

History

Founders and contributors 
The founder and first editor of the Bulletin of the Atomic Scientists was biophysicist Eugene Rabinowitch (1901–1973). He founded the magazine with physicist Hyman Goldsmith. Rabinowitch was a professor of botany and biophysics at the University of Illinois and was also a founding member of the Continuing Committee for the Pugwash Conferences on Science and World Affairs. In addition to Rabinowitch and Goldsmith, contributors have included: Morton Grodzins, Hans Bethe, Anatoli Blagonravov, Max Born, Harrison Brown, Stuart Chase, Brock Chisholm, E.U. Condon, Albert Einstein, E.K. Fedorov, Bernard T. Feld, James Franck, Ralph E. Lapp, Richard S. Leghorn, J. Robert Oppenheimer, Lord Boyd Orr, Michael Polanyi, Louis Ridenour, Bertrand Russell, Nikolay Semyonov, Leó Szilárd, Edward Teller, A.V. Topchiev, Harold C. Urey, Paul Weiss, James L. Tuck, among many others.

In 1949, the Educational Foundation for Nuclear Science incorporated as a not-for-profit 501(c)(3) organization to serve as the parent organization and fundraising mechanism of the Bulletin. In 2003, the Board of Directors voted to change the foundation's name to Bulletin of the Atomic Scientists.

Purpose
The Bulletin of the Atomic Scientists began as an emergency action undertaken by scientists who saw urgent need for an immediate educational program about atomic weapons. The intention was to educate fellow scientists about the relationship between their world of science and the world of national and international politics. A second was to help the American people understand what nuclear energy and its possible applications to war meant. The Bulletin contributors believed the atom bomb would only be the first of many dangers. The aim of the Bulletin was to carry out the long, sustained effort of educating people about the realities of the scientific age.

The Bulletin of the Atomic Scientists seeks to educate citizens, policy makers, scientists, and journalists by providing non-technical, scientifically sound and policy-relevant information about nuclear weapons, climate change, and other global security issues. The Bulletin also serves as a reliable, high-quality global forum for diverse international opinions on the best means of reducing reliance on nuclear weapons. Since its inception in 1945, the Bulletin has sought to educate the American public of the continual danger posed by nuclear weapons and other global dangers, most recently adding climate change and disruptive technologies in the life sciences to the list of concerns.

The Bulletin leadership consists of three boards, and it was announced on October 25, 2018 that California Governor Jerry Brown is joining the organization as executive chair.

Board of Sponsors
The Bulletin's Board of Sponsors is composed of accomplished science and security leaders from around the world. Members of the Board of Sponsors weigh in on critical issues, including the setting of the organization's Doomsday Clock. As of October 2018, the Bulletin's Board of Sponsors lists 14 Nobel Laureates.

Science and Security Board
The Bulletin Science and Security Board is composed of globally-recognized leaders who have specific areas of expertise in nuclear risk, climate change, and disruptive technologies. Members of the Science and Security Board provide the Bulletin organization and editorial staff with perspectives on trends and issues in their respective fields. Among their duties is the annual setting of the Doomsday Clock, with input from the Board of Sponsors.

Doomsday Clock

Once the Soviet Union developed atomic weapons, the concern surrounding the world's destruction was a great fear of the scientists working on the Bulletin. The proximity of nuclear devastation was a popular interest and, as a result, Bulletin co-editor Hyman Goldsmith asked landscape artist Martyl Langsdorf to create a cover for the June 1947 magazine. Langsdorf, who was married to Manhattan Project physicist Alexander Langsdorf, first considered using the symbol for uranium but then realized that a clock would better convey "a sense of urgency."  The resultant Doomsday Clock, which only has bullets labeling the numbers in the upper left hand corner, has been featured on the cover of the Bulletin many times since its creation.

The proximity of the minute hand to midnight has been the Bulletin leadership's way of warning the public about manmade threats to humanity; the Clock is a metaphor, not a prediction. When it began in 1947, the minute hand was 7 minutes to midnight; in 1953, when the Soviet Union continued to test more and more nuclear devices, it was 2 minutes to midnight.  This proximity to midnight of the Doomsday Clock during the early 1950s shows the concern that the Bulletin contributors had about the Soviet Union and the nuclear arms race. The warnings of the Bulletin continued throughout the 1950s and 1960s, and the focus of the efforts shifted slightly from warning about the dangers of nuclear war to the necessity of disarmament. In 2007, the leadership began taking anthropogenic climate change into account in its Clock discussions. Throughout the history of the Doomsday Clock, it has moved closer to midnight, and farther away, depending upon the status of the world at that time.  The Doomsday Clock has been getting closer to midnight since 1991, when it was set to 17 minutes to midnight, after the United States and the Soviet Union reached an agreement on nuclear arms reductions.

 the Doomsday Clock stands at 90 seconds to midnight. It is the closest approach to midnight, exceeding that of 1953, 2018 and 2020. The decision to move the hand of the Clock is made by the Bulletin Science and Security Board, which meets in person twice a year, with subcommittees meeting more often; the announcement of the decision is made each January. Each November, just prior to the Science and Security Board's fall discussion, the Bulletin hosts an annual dinner and meeting in Chicago; both events are open to the public. Reflecting international events dangerous to humankind, the Clock's hand has been adjusted 25 times since its inception in 1947, when it was initially set to seven minutes to midnight (11:53pm).

Present
In more recent years, articles of the Bulletin have focused on many topics, ranging from the dangers of radiation following the Chernobyl disaster to the impact of the fall of the Soviet Union. In the wake of the Soviet Union's collapse, other articles have focused on issues such as military spending  and the continued funding of missile defense systems designed to thwart nuclear attacks but that in reality may not work. With the ever-growing number of nuclear power plants and the demand for nuclear energy as a solution to climate change, the publication has focused a great deal on the costs and problems surrounding nuclear energy. In 2015, the Bulletin of the Atomic Scientists unveiled the Nuclear Fuel Cost Calculator.

Although the arms race and the Cold War, which were focuses of the Bulletin for many of the earlier years, are no longer occurring, the publication still focuses on the nuclear dangers that exist in the world today. As more countries such as Pakistan and India have tested nuclear weapons, the Bulletin has focused on the dangers posed by these countries. The Bulletin bi-monthly "Nuclear Notebook" is written by Federation of American Scientists experts Hans Kristensen and Matt Korda and tracks the number of nuclear weapons in the world by country. Robert "Stan" Norris, who was a founding co-author of the Nuclear Notebook, retired from the Notebook in 2018, although he is still a senior fellow at FAS. In 2015, the Bulletin added the Nuclear Notebook Interactive, an infographic that illustrates which countries have nuclear weapons and when they got them, and how many nuclear warheads they have in any given year. All nine nuclear-armed states are featured: the United States, Russia, China, India, Pakistan, France, Britain, Israel, and North Korea.

In the 21st century, articles have covered threats to humanity from a variety of sources. The potential dangers of nuclear weapons  and energy, military and political developments in the Post-Cold War world, political unrest in the Middle East (and its attendant potential for proliferation risks of nuclear and chemical weapons), myriad negative consequences of climate change, cyber warfare, and changes wrought by emerging technologies  have all been examined in the Bulletin in the most recent years. Examples include North Korea, Middle East, Syria, Fukushima,  Cybersecurity, and Climate Change.

In January 2015, longtime Executive Director and Publisher Kennette Benedict retired. Rachel Bronson took over as president and CEO of the organization. The editor of the Bulletin is John Mecklin.

Next Generation Initiative
As part of the Bulletin work to engage new audiences in issues related to nuclear threats, climate change, artificial intelligence, and biological threats, the publication launched its Next Generation Initiative to encourage young and emerging scholars to engage on these issues. Programs under the initiative have included writing workshops for graduate and undergraduate students, as well as the Voices of Tomorrow feature, which publishes articles and multimedia projects from emerging scholars and experts working in the Bulletin interest areas. Two Voices of Tomorrow authors, Emma Bastin and Yangyang Cheng, had their work republished in Teen Vogue.

The capstone of the initiative is the Leonard M. Rieser Award, selected each December by the Bulletins editorial team from among the year's Voices of Tomorrow submissions. The recipient of the Rieser Award receives $1,000 and a subscription to the Bulletins bi-monthly magazine. In 2018, Erin Connolly and Kate Hewitt shared the award for their article "American students aren't taught nuclear weapons policy in school. Here's how to fix that problem." Recent recipients include Yangyang Cheng, Nikita Perumal and Moritz Kütt.

Online editions 
The Bulletin has had a public-access website available online for some years, with a subscription magazine that comes out 6 times per year and is currently published by Taylor & Francis Online. An e-newsletter is also available without charge by signing up via the Bulletin website.

Backfiles of the subscription magazine are available in the John A. Simpson Collection. The backfile from the first (1945) issue through the November 1998 issue of the Bulletin has also been made available free of charge via Google Books.

November/December 2008 was the last print edition of the Bulletin, which became all-digital only that year. SAGE Publications began publishing the Bulletin subscription magazine in September 2010; Taylor & Francis took over from Sage in January 2016.

Indexing 
The journal is indexed in the Journal Citation Reports, which states that the journal has a 2016 impact factor of 0.452, ranking it 71st out of 83 journals in the category "International Relations" and 32nd out of 41 journals in the category "Social Issues".

Awards
 Finalist for 2009 Lumity Technology Leadership Award
 2007 National Magazine Award for General Excellence under 100,000 circulation sponsored by the American Society of Magazine Editors with the Columbia University Graduate School of Journalism
 2006 Silver Excel Award for Magazine Excellence, 20,000 or Fewer for the July/August, September/October, and November/December 2005 issues sponsored by the Society of National Publications
 2002 Nuclear-Free Future Award
 1992 Olive Branch Award for articles by David Albright and Mark Hibbs from the N.Y.U. Center for War, Peace and the News Media
 1990 Olive Branch Award from the N.Y.U. Center for War, Peace and the News Media
 1989 Olive Branch Award from the N.Y.U. Center for War, Peace and the News Media
 1988 Olive Branch Award from the N.Y.U. Center for War, Peace and the News Media
 1987 Olive Branch Award from the N.Y.U. Center for War, Peace and the News Media 
 1987 National Magazine Award 
 1983 Forum Award for the Bulletin of the Atomic Scientists and Ruth Adams, editor sponsored by the Forum on Physics and Society American Physical Society

See also
 Franck Report
 List of international relations journals
 Richard Garwin

Notes and references
The records of the Bulletin are kept at the Special Collections Research Center of the University of Chicago Library.

External links

The John A. Simpson Archive at Taylor & Francis
Digitized Bulletin of the Atomic Scientists on Google Books

Political science journals
Physics journals
Intelligence websites
Nuclear weapons policy
Anti–nuclear weapons movement
Publications established in 1945
Taylor & Francis academic journals
Science advocacy organizations
Bimonthly journals
1945 establishments in the United States
Existential risk organizations